Samuel Peter Hibbins (born 18 February 1982) is an Australian politician. He has been a Greens member of the Victorian Legislative Assembly since November 2014, representing the electoral district of Prahran. Along with Ellen Sandell who won Melbourne at the same election, Hibbins was one of the first two Greens politicians elected to the Victorian lower house. Hibbins is also the first Greens candidate to gain a seat from a sitting Liberal MP.

Prior to his election, Hibbins was a councillor on the City of Stonnington council from 2012 to 2014. Before that, Hibbins was a youth worker at the Victorian Government's Department of Human Services. He had previously contested the seat of Malvern at the 2010 state election, and the seat of Higgins at the federal election in the same year.

Political career 
Hibbins contested the Victorian seat of Prahran, the state's smallest seat, in 2014. The seat was tightly contested, with Hibbins preferred over Labor's Neil Pharaoh by only 31 votes, and defeating incumbent Clem Newtown-Brown on the two-party preferred vote. The Hibbins campaign focus included building a new secondary school and the redevelopment of South Yarra railway station.

Hibbins was re-elected in 2018. He has held the Victorian Greens' portfolios of Spokesperson Major Events, Education and Youth since December 2018. He has also held the portfolios of Spokesperson for Consumer Affairs, Housing, Planning, Local Government, and Industrial Relations since June 2020.
In 2021, Hibbins's proposed South Yarra railway station upgrades were completed.

References

External links
 
 Parliamentary voting record of Sam Hibbins at Victorian Parliament Tracker

1982 births
Living people
Members of the Victorian Legislative Assembly
Australian Greens members of the Parliament of Victoria
Victoria (Australia) local councillors
Australian social workers
Australian Catholic University alumni
Macquarie University alumni
21st-century Australian politicians